Bargushad and similar spellings may refer to:

 Bargyushad, a village in the Barda Rayon of Azerbaijan
 Bərgüşad, a village and municipality in the Ujar Rayon of Azerbaijan
 Bərguşad, another name for Vorotan (river)

See also 
 Bargoshad (disambiguation)